Anthony Marriott JP (17 January 1931, London – 17 April 2014) was a British playwright, screenwriter and actor.

As a playwright he was best known as the joint author, with Alistair Foot, of the farce No Sex Please, We're British which opened at the Strand Theatre, London, on 3 June 1971. It has been performed in 52 countries and which on 21 February 1979 became the longest running comedy in the history of world theatre. A film version starring Ronnie Corbett was released in 1973.

In 1967 Marriott was hired by Amicus Productions to rewrite the screenplay penned by Robert Bloch for The Deadly Bees, a film based on the novel A Taste for Honey by Gerald Heard. 

Marriott also co-created the long-running British television series Public Eye with Roger Marshall.

He lived for many years in Osterley, West London and was a JP.

Other plays
 With Alistair Foot, Uproar in the House, Garrick Theatre and Whitehall Theatre, 1967–69
 With John Chapman, Shut Your Eyes and Think of England, Apollo Theatre, 1977

References

External links

1931 births
2014 deaths
English male stage actors
English screenwriters
English male screenwriters
English male dramatists and playwrights
20th-century English dramatists and playwrights
20th-century English male writers
Writers from London
Male actors from London